A yield spread premium (YSP) is the money or rebate paid to a mortgage broker for giving a borrower a higher interest rate on a loan in exchange for lower up front costs, generally paid in origination fees, broker fees or discount points.  This “may [be used to] wipe out or offset other loan costs, like Loan Level Pricing Adjustments (instituted by FNMA).”

References

External links
Howell E. Jackson and Jeremy Berry: Kickbacks or Compensation: The Case of Yield Spread Premiums, Harvard Law School
Yield Spread Premium and HR 3915 — Mortgage News Daily

Mortgage industry of the United States